Khwaja Hasan Sani Nizami (15 May 1931 – 15 March 2015) (birth name Khwaja Hasan Abu Talib Nizami) was a Sufi Shaykh of Nizami branch of Chishti Order
 and the former Sajjadanasheen (head caretaker) of Nizamuddin Auliya's shrine and considered as the most prominent figure of Urdu literature. He was a member of United Nations Religious Initiatives, San Francisco of United States of America. He was the son of Khwaja Hasan Nizami and the master of Iqbal Ahmad Khan.

Career
Khwaja received his primary education from his home and was later graduated from Jamia Millia Islamia.

Khwaja was a member of  Delhi Urdu Academy, Ghalib Academy and Ghalib Institute, and was the Chairman of Ghalib Academy. He was also the founder-member of All India Sufi Conference, Hyderabad, secretary of Khwaja Hasan Nizami Memorial Society and member of National Ameer Khusro Society. Khwaja was also said to be the editor of " the  Munadi" (monthly magazine) after his father Khwaja Hasan Nizami from 1955 onwards, which he continued publishing under his editorship from 1955 onwards.

Khwaja was fond of Qawwali, He used to organize various Qawwali programmes in Nizamuddin Auliya's shrine.

Khwaja was one of the Islamic leader who condemned Taliban as 'out of Islam' organization in 2006.

Literary Works
Khwaja republished various literary works which was written by his father Khwaja Hasan Nizami which are as follows
Tarjuma e Quran e Majid

Fawaidul Fawaad (Urdu Tarjuma)

Tasawwuf (Rasm Aur Haqeeqath)

Tazkira E Nizami

Tazkira E Khusravi

Nizami Bansari

 A'mal e Hizbul Bahar
Begamaat ke aansu (editor)

Awards and legacy
Khwaja received Delhi Gaurav award from  Indian Government under prime minister ship of Atal Bihari Vajpayee.

In 2017, Urdu Academy organized an evening in the memory of Khwaja Hasan Sani Nizami at Kashmiri gate.

Books  based on life and achievements of  Khwaja Hasan Sani Nizami, was released by Mohammad Hamid Ansari in the month of April 2017.

Khwaja's family members were working as the Sajjad Nashin of Nizamuddin Auliya's shrine from the era of Prithviraj Chauhan.

Ultimately, in March 2015, Khwaja's soul united with Allah after prolonged heart disease and diabetes, leaving behind his successor Khwaja Syed Muhammad Nizami

Khwaja's funeral prayer was performed twice, one was by the Imam of Jama Masjid of Nizamuddin Auliya's shrine and another by his disciple Syed Rashid Nizami

Khwaja Ikram Nizami is one of the disciple of Khwaja, leading the Nizami Sufi order in Nagpur.

References

1931 births
2015 deaths
Indian Sufis
Hanafi fiqh scholars
Indian Sunni Muslim scholars of Islam
Translators of the Quran into Urdu
20th-century translators